Kamalgir (also Romanized as Kamālgīr; also known as Jamālgīr and Kamāngīr) is a village in Mansuri Rural District, Homeyl District, Eslamabad-e Gharb County, Kermanshah Province, Iran. At the 2006 census, its population was 93, in 18 families.

References 

Populated places in Eslamabad-e Gharb County